This was the first edition of the tournament.

Catherine Bellis won the title, defeating Zhang Shuai in the final 6–4, 6–2.

Seeds

Main draw

Finals

Top half

Bottom half

References 
 Main draw
 Qualifying draw

Hawaii Tennis Open
Hawaii Tennis Open - Singles
2016 in sports in Hawaii